The 1995 CIBC Canadian Senior Curling Championships were held January 21 to 29 at the Thistle-St. Andrews Curling Club in Saint John, New Brunswick.

Men's

Teams

Standings

Results

Draw 1

Draw 2

Draw 3

Draw 4

Draw 5

Draw 6

Draw 7

Draw 8

Draw 9

Draw 10

Draw 11

Draw 12

Draw 13

Draw 14

Draw 15

Draw 16

Draw 17

Playoffs

Semifinal

Final

Women's

Teams

Standings

Results

Draw 1

Draw 2

Draw 3

Draw 4

Draw 5

Draw 6

Draw 7

Draw 8

Draw 9

Draw 10

Draw 11

Draw 12

Draw 13

Draw 14

Draw 15

Draw 16

Draw 17

Playoffs

Semifinal

Final

References

External links
Men's statistics
Women's statistics

1995 in Canadian curling
Canadian Senior Curling Championships
Curling competitions in Saint John, New Brunswick
1995 in New Brunswick
January 1995 sports events in Canada